Church of St. Francis Xavier-Catholic may refer to:

Church of St. Francis Xavier-Catholic (Benson, Minnesota), listed on the National Register of Historic Places in Swift County, Minnesota
Church of St. Francis Xavier-Catholic (Grand Marais, Minnesota), listed on the National Register of Historic Places in Cook County, Minnesota

See also 
 Church of Saint Francis Xavier (disambiguation)
 St. Francis Xavier Church (disambiguation)